Monica MacIvor (October 1881 – 13 December 1939) was a South African painter. Her work was part of the painting event in the art competition at the 1936 Summer Olympics.

She was born in Iran to parents who were originally from Ireland, which was then part of the United Kingdom. She lived much of her life in Great Britain but by the mid 1930s had moved to South Africa.

References

External links
 

1881 births
1939 deaths
British expatriates in Iran
British emigrants to South Africa
20th-century South African painters
South African women painters
Olympic competitors in art competitions
People from Bushehr